TILEPro64 is a VLIW ISA multicore processor (Tile processor) manufactured by Tilera.  It consists of a cache-coherent mesh network of 64 "tiles", where each tile houses a general purpose processor, cache, and a non-blocking router, which the tile uses to communicate with the other tiles on the processor.

The short-pipeline, in-order, three-issue cores implement a VLIW instruction set.  Each core has a register file and three functional units: two integer arithmetic logic units and a load-store unit. Each of the cores ("tile") has its own L1 and L2 caches plus an overall virtual L3 cache which is an aggregate of all the L2 caches. A core is able to run a full operating system on its own or multiple cores can be used to run a symmetrical multi-processing operating system.

TILEPro64 has four DDR2 controllers at up to 800MT/s, two 10-gigabit Ethernet XAUI interfaces, two four-lane PCIe interfaces, and a "flexible" input/output interface, which can be software-configured to handle a number of protocols.  The processor is fabricated using a 90 nm process and runs at speeds of 600 to 866 MHz.

According to the company, Tilera targets the chip at networking equipment, digital video, and wireless infrastructure markets where the demands for computing processing are high.  More recently, Tilera has positioned this processor in the cloud computing space with an 8-processor (512-core) 2U server built by Quanta Computer.

TILEPro was supported by the Linux kernel from version 2.6.36 to version 4.16.

Technology

Various sources have stated the specifications of processors in the TILEPro family:
 64 RISC processor cores
 16 KB L1 instruction and 8 KB L1 data cache per core
 64 KB L2 cache per core
 4MB L3 cache is achieved through the sharing of other tiles L2 caches with hardware-managed coherency
 90 nm manufacturing process at TSMC
 4 integrated memory controllers supporting DDR2 SDRAM at up to 800MT/s
 supports up to 64GB of attached DDR2 memory
 Integrated high-speed I/O
 Two 4-lane PCI Express Gen1 interfaces, with root or endpoint capability
 Two 10Gbit/s Ethernet XAUI interfaces
 Two 10/100/1000 Mbit/s Ethernet RGMII interfaces
 Power consumption in the range of 19 - 23 Watts

The TILEPro family incorporates a number of enhancements over Tilera's first generation TILE64 family:
 "Distributed Dynamic Cache" (DDC) system that uses a separate mesh network to manage cache-coherency
 "TileDirect" I/O enables direct transfer of network data coherently into the processor caches
 Double the L1 instruction cache (from 8KB to 16KB), double the L2 associativity
 Memory "striping" on the DDR2 interfaces to balance the loading
 Instruction set enhancements for multimedia, unaligned data access, offset load/store instructions and memory access hints

The networking software company 6WIND provides high-performance packet processing software for the TILEPro64 platform.

References

External links
Tilera Website
https://www.theregister.co.uk/2008/09/23/tilera_cpu_upgrade/

Manycore processors
Very long instruction word computing
Computer-related introductions in 2008